Gortnaleck is a townland in the civil parish of Templeport, County Cavan, Ireland. It lies in the Roman Catholic parish of Templeport and barony of Tullyhaw.

Geography

Gortnaleck is bounded on the north by Cloneary townland, on the west by Rosehill, Templeport townland, on the south by Camagh townland and on the east by Kilnavert townland. Its chief geographical features are Gortnaleck Lough, dug wells and a stone quarry. The 1836 Ordnance Survey Namebooks state-The soil is intermixed with limestone (which limestone is probably what gave the townland its name). Gortnaleck  is traversed by the national secondary R205 road (Ireland), minor public roads and rural lanes. The townland covers 95 statute acres.

History

In medieval times the McGovern barony of Tullyhaw was divided into economic taxation areas called ballibetoes, from the Irish Baile Biataigh (Anglicized as 'Ballybetagh'), meaning 'A Provisioner's Town or Settlement'. The original purpose was to enable the farmer, who controlled the baile, to provide hospitality for those who needed it, such as poor people and travellers. The ballybetagh was further divided into townlands farmed by individual families who paid a tribute or tax to the head of the ballybetagh, who in turn paid a similar tribute to the clan chief. The steward of the ballybetagh would have been the secular equivalent of the erenagh in charge of church lands. There were seven ballibetoes in the parish of Templeport. Gortnaleck was located in the ballybetagh of Ballymagauran. The historical spellings of the ballybetagh are Ballymackgawran & Ballimacgawran (Irish = Baile Mhic Shamhráin = McGovern's Town).

The 1609 Baronial Map depicts the townland as part of Kilcrooghan.

The 1652 Commonwealth Survey spells the name as Gortnelecke and also lists Killecrooghan.

The 1665 Down Survey map depicts it as Gortneleck.

William Petty's 1685 map depicts it as Gortneleak.

In the Plantation of Ulster by grant dated 29 April 1611, along with other lands, King James VI and I granted one poll of Gortneleck to the McGovern Chief, Feidhlimidh Mág Samhradháin. The townland had been part of the McGovern chief's personal demesne for several hundred years before this and it was just a Surrender and regrant confirming the existing title to the then chief. This is confirmed in a visitation by George Carew, 1st Earl of Totnes in autumn 1611 when he states that Magauran had his own land given him on this division.

An Inquisition of King Charles I held in Cavan town on 4 October 1626 stated that the aforesaid Phelim Magawrane died on 20 January 1622 and his lands including one poll of Gortnaleck went to his son, the McGovern chief Brian Magauran who was aged 30 (born 1592) and married.

In the Irish Rebellion of 1641 William Reynolds of Lisnaore made a deposition about the rebellion in Lissanover which referred to two rebels from Gortneleck, Daniel McGowran and his son Edmund McGowran, as follows-

folio 260r
 William Reynolds Jur 6o Apr 1643 Will: Aldrich Hen: Brereton John Sterne: Cavan William Reinolds Jur 6o Apr 1643 Intw Cert fact [Copy at MS 832, fols 59r59v]

The McGovern lands in Gortnaleck were confiscated in the Cromwellian Act for the Settlement of Ireland 1652 and were distributed as follows-

The 1652 Commonwealth Survey lists the proprietor of Gortnaleck as Hugh McFadeene and the proprietor of Killecrooghan as John Boyd.

In the Hearth Money Rolls compiled on 29 September 1663 there was one person paying the Hearth Tax in the townland Gartnebacke- Hugh McFadin (i.e. the same person mentioned in 1652 above).

Two grants dated 30 January 1668 were made by King Charles II of England as follows- Firstly one cartron of land in Gortnelecke containing 29 acres to Hugh McFaden. This was the same man mentioned in the Commonwealth Survey and Hearth Rolls above. Secondly to Mary Boyd in the parte of ye cartron of Kilcrohan containing 34 acres 0 roods 6 perches at an annual rent of £0-9s-2 1/4d

In the Templeport Poll Book of 1761 there was one person registered to vote in Gortnaleg in the 1761 Irish general election - Richard Hazard. He lived in Garden Hill, County Fermanagh but owned a freehold in Gortnaleck. He was entitled to cast two votes. The four election candidates were Charles Coote, 1st Earl of Bellomont and  Lord Newtownbutler (later Brinsley Butler, 2nd Earl of Lanesborough), both of whom were then elected Member of Parliament for Cavan County. The losing candidates were George Montgomery (MP) of Ballyconnell and Barry Maxwell, 1st Earl of Farnham. Hazard voted for Maxwell and Montgomery. Absence from the poll book either meant a resident did not vote or more likely was not a freeholder entitled to vote, which would mean most of the inhabitants of Gortnaleck.

The 1790 Cavan Carvaghs list spells the name as Gortnabeck''.

The Tithe Applotment Books for 1827 list four tithepayers in the townland.

In 1833 one person in Gortnaleck was registered as a keeper of weapons – James Lauder.

The Gortnaleck Valuation Office Field books are available for 1839-1840.

Griffith's Valuation of 1857 lists four landholders in the townland.

Census

In the 1901 census of Ireland, there are four families listed in the townland.

In the 1911 census of Ireland, there are only two families listed in the townland.

Antiquities

The chief structures of historical interest in the townland are

 An earthen ringfort.
 An enclosure.
 A crannog in Gortnaleck Lough.
 A Lime kiln

References

External links
The IreAtlas Townland Data Base

Townlands of County Cavan